Ceratozamia kuesteriana is a species of cycad in the family Zamiaceae that is endemic to the Sierra Madre Oriental of Mexico.

It is restricted to steep slopes in pine-oak dominated cloud forests between Gómez Farías and Tula in southern Tamaulipas.

Ceratozamia kuesteriana is threatened by habitat loss and collecting. The total wild population is believed to number no more than 300 plants.

References

kuesteriana
Endemic flora of Mexico
Flora of Tamaulipas
Flora of the Sierra Madre Oriental
Critically endangered plants
Endangered biota of Mexico
Plants described in 1857
Taxa named by Eduard August von Regel
Taxonomy articles created by Polbot